Sorgi is a surname. Notable people with the surname include:

 Erica Sorgi (born 1982), American diver
 Jim Sorgi (born 1980), American football player
 João Pedro Sorgi (born 1993), Brazilian tennis player
 Marcello Sorgi (born 1955), Italian journalist and author